Gilbert High School is a public high school located in Gilbert, South Carolina that provides education for ninth through twelfth grade. It is one of five high schools that are a part of Lexington School District 1.

State championships

Baseball (1988, 2006, 2008, 2012, 2021)
Rugby (2007, 2009, 2010)
Women's volleyball (1996, 1997)
Men's cross country (2004)
Women's track (1986)
Marching Band (1995, 1996, 2011)
Girls Golf (2021)

References

External links 
 http://ghs.lexington1.net

Schools in Lexington County, South Carolina
Public high schools in South Carolina